Joseph N. Dinand, S.J. (December 3, 1869 – July 29, 1943) was an American-born bishop of the Catholic Church. He twice served as president at the College of the Holy Cross from 1911 to 1918 and from 1924 to 1927.  He also served as the Vicar Apostolic of Jamaica from 1927 to 1929.

Biography
Joseph Nicholas Dinand was born in Boston, Massachusetts to John and Julia (Looney) Dinand.  He received his primary and secondary education in Boston before enrolling in Boston College.  Emmet made his novitiate in Frederick, Maryland and professed vows in the Society of Jesus (Jesuits) on August 15, 1880.  He continued his education at the College of the Sacred Heart in Woodstock, Maryland and was ordained a priest there by Cardinal James Gibbons of Baltimore on June 25, 1903.  He professed final vows on August 15, 1906.  His ministry as a Jesuit centered on education. He was a member of the faculty of St. George's College in Kingston, Jamaica, and he served two terms as president at the College of the Holy Cross in Worcester, Massachusetts.

On July 12, 1927 Pope Pius XI appointed Dinand as the Titular Bishop of Selinus and Vicar Apostolic of Jamaica. He was consecrated by Bishop Thomas M. O'Leary of Springfield in Massachusetts on October 30, 1927. The principal co-consecrators were Bishops Joseph J. Rice of Burlington and John G. Murray of Portland.  Dinand continued to serve as the Vicar Apostolic until his resignation was accepted by Pope Pius XI on October 4, 1929 for health reasons. He died in Weston, Massachusetts at the age of 73 on July 29, 1943.

References

1869 births
1943 deaths
Clergy from Boston
Presidents of the College of the Holy Cross
19th-century American Jesuits
20th-century American Jesuits
Jesuit bishops
American Roman Catholic missionaries
Roman Catholic missionaries in Jamaica
20th-century Roman Catholic bishops in Jamaica
20th-century American Roman Catholic titular bishops
American expatriates in Jamaica
Roman Catholic bishops of Kingston in Jamaica